KUAU (1570 AM) is a radio station licensed to serve Haiku, Hawaii.  The station is owned by First Assembly King's Cathedral and Chapels.  It airs a Religious Talk radio format.

The station was assigned the KUAU call letters by the Federal Communications Commission on June 28, 1991.

References

External links
King's Cathedral and Chapels official website

UAU
Talk radio stations in the United States
Radio stations established in 1991
1991 establishments in Hawaii